The Alédjo Wildlife Reserve is located in the Tchaoudjo and Assoli Prefectures in Togo. The wildlife reserve consists of some 765 total hectares of protected areas with biological diversity and geological formations. It is a tourist destination, known for its natural environment and wildlife.

World Heritage Status 
This site was added to the UNESCO World Heritage Tentative List on January 8, 2002 in the Mixed (Cultural and Natural) category.

References 

Wildlife sanctuaries
Environment of Togo
World Heritage Sites in Togo